M.C. Brains (born James DeShannon Davis) is an American rapper from Cleveland, Ohio, United States. He is best known for his hit single, "Oochie Coochie".

Discovered by Michael Bivins of New Edition, Brains was signed to Motown Records, who issued his debut album Lovers Lane in 1992.  The album's lead single, "Oochie Coochie", became a top-40 hit, peaking at number 21 on the Billboard Hot 100 and earning a gold certification four months after its release then on to platinum. Lovers Lane reached gold status. In 1996, M.C. Brains (under the name M.C. Brainz) released a second album entitled Brainwashed for Ichiban Records.

Discography

Albums

Singles

References

1974 births
African-American male rappers
American male rappers
Ichiban Records artists
Living people
Rappers from Cleveland
21st-century American rappers
21st-century American male musicians
21st-century African-American musicians
20th-century African-American people